Leninism is a political ideology developed by Russian Marxist revolutionary Vladimir Lenin that proposes the establishment of the dictatorship of the proletariat led by a revolutionary vanguard party as the political prelude to the establishment of communism. The function of the Leninist vanguard party is to provide the working classes with the political consciousness (education and organisation) and revolutionary leadership necessary to depose capitalism in the Russian Empire (1721–1917). 

Leninist revolutionary leadership is based upon The Communist Manifesto (1848), identifying the communist party as "the most advanced and resolute section of the working class parties of every country; that section which pushes forward all others." As the vanguard party, the Bolsheviks viewed history through the theoretical framework of dialectical materialism, which sanctioned political commitment to the successful overthrow of capitalism, and then to instituting socialism; and, as the revolutionary national government, to realise the socio-economic transition by all means.

In the aftermath of the October Revolution (1917), Leninism was the dominant version of Marxism in Russia and the basis of soviet democracy, the rule of directly elected soviets. In establishing the socialist mode of production in Bolshevik Russia—with the Decree on Land (1917), war communism (1918–1921), and the New Economic Policy (1921–1928)—the revolutionary régime suppressed most political opposition, including Marxists who opposed Lenin's actions, the anarchists and the Mensheviks, factions of the Socialist Revolutionary Party and the Left Socialist-Revolutionaries. The Russian Civil War (1917–1922), which included the seventeen-army Allied intervention in the Russian Civil War (1917–1925), and left-wing uprisings against the Bolsheviks (1918–1924), was an external and internal war which transformed Bolshevik Russia into the Russian Socialist Federative Soviet Republic (RSFSR), the core republic of the Union of Soviet Socialist Republics (USSR).

As revolutionary praxis, Leninism originally was neither a proper philosophy nor a discrete political theory. Leninism comprises politico-economic developments of orthodox Marxism and Lenin's interpretations of Marxism, which function as a pragmatic synthesis for practical application to the actual conditions (political, social, economic) of the post-emancipation agrarian society of Imperial Russia in the early 20th century. As a political-science term, Lenin's theory of proletarian revolution entered common usage at the fifth congress of the Communist International (1924), when Grigory Zinoviev applied the term Leninism to denote "vanguard-party revolution." Leninism was accepted as part of CPSU's vocabulary and doctrine around 1922, and in January 1923, despite objections from Lenin, it entered the public vocabulary.

Historical background 

In the 19th century, Karl Marx and Friedrich Engels wrote the Manifesto of the Communist Party (1848), in which they called for the political unification of the European working classes in order to achieve communist revolution; and proposed that because the socio-economic organisation of communism was of a higher form than that of capitalism, a workers' revolution first would occur in the industrialised countries. In Germany, Marxist social democracy was the political perspective of the Social Democratic Party of Germany, inspiring Russian Marxists, such as Lenin.

In the early 20th century, the socio-economic backwardness of Imperial Russia (1721–1917)—combined and uneven economic development—facilitated rapid and intensive industrialisation, which produced a united, working-class proletariat in a predominantly agrarian society. Moreover, because industrialisation was financed chiefly with foreign capital, Imperial Russia did not possess a revolutionary bourgeoisie with political and economic influence upon the workers and the peasants, as had been the case in the French Revolution (1789–1799) in the 18th century. Although Russia's political economy was agrarian and semi-feudal, the task of democratic revolution fell to the urban, industrial working class as the only social class capable of effecting land reform and democratisation, in view that the Russian bourgeoisie would suppress any revolution.

In the April Theses (1917), the political strategy of the October Revolution (7–8 November 1917), Lenin proposed that the Russian revolution was not an isolated national event but a fundamentally international event—the first socialist revolution in the world. Lenin's practical application of Marxism and proletarian revolution to the social, political, and economic conditions of agrarian Russia motivated and impelled the "revolutionary nationalism of the poor" to depose the absolute monarchy of the three-hundred-year dynasty of the House of Romanov (1613–1917), as tsars of Russia.

Imperialism 
In Imperialism, the Highest Stage of Capitalism (1916), Lenin's economic analyses indicated that capitalism would transform into a global financial system, by which industrialised countries exported financial capital to their colonies and so realise the exploitation of the labour of the natives and the exploitation of the natural resources of their countries. Such superexploitation allows wealthy countries to maintain a domestic labour aristocracy with a slightly higher standard of living than most workers, ensuring peaceful labour–capital relations in the capitalist homeland. Therefore, a proletarian revolution of workers and peasants could not occur in capitalist countries whilst the imperialist global-finance system remained in place. The first proletarian revolution would have to occur in an underdeveloped country, such as Imperial Russia, the politically weakest country in the capitalist global-finance system in the early 20th century. In the United States of Europe Slogan (1915), Lenin wrote:

In "Left-Wing" Communism: An Infantile Disorder (1920), Lenin wrote:

Leninist praxis

Vanguard party 

In Chapter II, "Proletarians and Communists", of The Communist Manifesto (1848), Marx and Engels present the communist party as the political vanguard solely qualified to lead the proletariat in revolution:

The revolutionary purpose of the Leninist vanguard party is to establish the dictatorship of the proletariat with the working class's support. The communist party would lead the popular deposition of the Tsarist government and then transfer government power to the working class; that change of the ruling class—from the bourgeoisie to the proletariat—makes establishing socialism possible. In What Is To Be Done? (1902), Lenin said that a revolutionary vanguard party, recruited from the working class, should lead the political campaign because only in that way would the proletariat successfully realise their revolution; unlike the economic campaign of trade-union-struggle advocated by other socialist political parties and the anarcho-syndicalists. Like Marx, Lenin distinguished between the aspects of a revolution, the "economic campaign" (labour strikes for increased wages and work concessions) that featured diffused plural leadership; and the "political campaign" (socialist changes to society), which required the decisive, revolutionary leadership of the Bolshevik vanguard party.

Democratic centralism 

Based upon the First International (IWA, International Workingmen's Association, 1864–1876), Lenin organised the Bolsheviks as a democratically centralised vanguard party; wherein free political speech was recognised as legitimate until policy consensus; afterwards, every member of the party was expected to abide by the agreed policy. Democratic debate was Bolshevik practice, even after Lenin banned factions among the Party in 1921. Despite being a guiding political influence, Lenin did not exercise absolute power and continually debated to have his points of view accepted as a course of revolutionary action. In Freedom to Criticise and Unity of Action (1905), Lenin said:

Proletarian revolution 
Before the October Revolution, despite supporting moderate political reform—including Bolsheviks elected to the Duma when opportune—Lenin said that capitalism could only be overthrown with proletarian revolution, not with gradual reforms—from within (Fabianism) and from without (social democracy)—which would fail because the bourgeoisie's control of the means of production determined the nature of political power in Russia. As epitomised in the slogan "For a Democratic Dictatorship of the Proletariat and Peasantry", a proletarian revolution in underdeveloped Russia required a united proletariat (peasants and industrial workers) to assume government power in the cities successfully. Moreover, owing to the middle-class aspirations of much of the peasantry, Leon Trotsky said that the proletarian leadership of the revolution would ensure truly socialist and democratic socio-economic change.

Dictatorship of the proletariat 

In Bolshevik Russia, government by direct democracy was realised and effected by the soviets (elected councils of workers), which Lenin said was the "democratic dictatorship of the proletariat" postulated in orthodox Marxism. The soviets comprised representative committees from the factories and the trade unions but excluded the capitalist social class to establish a proletarian government by and for the working class and the peasants. Concerning the political disenfranchisement of the capitalist social class in Bolshevik Russia, Lenin said that "depriving the exploiters of the franchise is a purely Russian question, and not a question of the dictatorship of the proletariat, in general. ... In which countries ...democracy for the exploiters will be, in one or another form, restricted ...is a question of the specific national features of this or that capitalism." In chapter five of The State and Revolution (1917), Lenin describes the dictatorship of the proletariat as:

Concerning the disenfranchisement from democracy of the capitalist social class, Lenin said: "Democracy for the vast majority of the people, and suppression by force, i.e. exclusion from democracy, of the exploiters and oppressors of the people—this is the change democracy undergoes during the transition from capitalism to communism." The dictatorship of the proletariat was effected with soviet constitutionalism, a form of government opposite to the dictatorship of capital (privately owned means of production) practised in bourgeois democracies. Under soviet constitutionalism, the Leninist vanguard party would be one of many political parties competing for election to government power. Nevertheless, because of the Russian Civil War (1917–1924) and the anti-Bolshevik terrorism of opposing political parties aiding the White Armies' counter-revolution, the Bolshevik government banned all other political parties, which left the Leninist vanguard party as the only political party in Russia. Lenin said that such political suppression was not philosophically inherent to the dictatorship of the proletariat.

Economics 

The Bolshevik government nationalised industry and established a foreign-trade monopoly to allow the productive coordination of the national economy and so prevent Russian national industries from competing against each other. To feed the populaces of town and country, Lenin instituted war communism (1918–1921) as a necessary condition—adequate supplies of food and weapons—for fighting the Russian Civil War. In March 1921, the New Economic Policy (NEP, 1921–1929) allowed limited local capitalism (private commerce and internal free trade) and replaced grain requisitions with an agricultural tax managed by state banks. The NEP was meant to resolve food-shortage riots by the peasantry and allowed limited private enterprise; the profit motive encouraged farmers to produce the crops required to feed town and country; and to economically re-establish the urban working class, who had lost many workers to fight the counter-revolutionary Civil War. The NEP nationalisation of the economy then would facilitate the industrialisation of Russia, politically strengthen the working class, and raise the standards of living for all Russians. Lenin said that the appearance of new socialist states was necessary for strengthening Russia's economy in establishing Russian socialism. Lenin's socio-economic perspective was supported by the German Revolution of 1918–1919, the Italian insurrection and general strikes of 1920, and worker wage-riots in the UK, France, and the US.

National self-determination 
In recognising and accepting nationalism among oppressed peoples, Lenin advocated their national right to self-determination and so opposed Russian chauvinism because such ethnocentrism was a cultural obstacle to establishing the dictatorship of the proletariat in every territory of the deposed Russian Empire (1721–1917). In The Right of Nations to Self-determination (1914), Lenin said:

The socialist internationalism of Marxism and Bolshevism is based upon class struggle and a people's transcending nationalism, ethnocentrism, and religion—the intellectual obstacles to progressive class consciousness—which are the cultural status quo that the capitalist ruling class manipulates in order to divide the working classes and the peasant classes politically. To overcome that barrier to establishing socialism, Lenin said that acknowledging nationalism, as a people's right of self-determination and right of secession, naturally would allow socialist states to transcend the political limitations of nationalism to form a federation. In The Question of Nationalities, or 'Autonomisation (1923), Lenin said:

 Socialist culture 
The role of the Leninist vanguard party was to politically educate the workers and peasants to dispel the societal false consciousness of religion and nationalism that constitute the cultural status quo taught by the bourgeoisie to the proletariat to facilitate their economic exploitation of peasants and workers. Influenced by Lenin, the Central Committee of the Bolshevik Party stated that the development of the socialist workers' culture should not be "hamstrung from above" and opposed the Proletkult (1917–1925) organisational control of the national culture.

 Leninism after 1924 

 Stalinism 

In post-Revolutionary Russia, Stalinism (socialism in one country) and Trotskyism (permanent world revolution) were the principal philosophies of communism that claimed legitimate ideological descent from Leninism; thus, within the Communist Party, each ideological faction denied the political legitimacy of the opposing faction. Until shortly before his death, Lenin countered Stalin's disproportionate political influence in the Communist Party and the bureaucracy of the Soviet government, partly because of abuses he had committed against the populace of Georgia and partly because the autocratic Stalin had accumulated administrative power disproportionate to his office of General Secretary of the Communist Party.

The counter-action against Stalin aligned with Lenin's advocacy of the right of self-determination for the national and ethnic groups of the deposed Tsarist Empire. Lenin warned the Party that Stalin had "unlimited authority concentrated in his hands, and I am not sure whether he will always be capable of using that authority with sufficient caution" and formed a faction with Leon Trotsky to remove Stalin as the General Secretary of the Communist Party.

To that end followed proposals reducing the administrative powers of party posts to reduce bureaucratic influence upon the policies of the Communist Party. Lenin advised Trotsky to emphasise Stalin's recent bureaucratic alignment in such matters (e.g. undermining the anti-bureaucratic workers' and peasants' Inspection) and argued to depose Stalin as General Secretary. Despite advice to refuse "any rotten compromise", he did not heed Lenin's advice and General Secretary Stalin retained power over the Communist Party and the bureaucracy of the Soviet government.

 Trotskyism 

After Lenin's death (21 January 1924), Trotsky ideologically battled the influence of Stalin, who formed ruling blocs within the Russian Communist Party (with Grigory Zinoviev and Lev Kamenev, then with Nikolai Bukharin and then by himself) and so determined soviet government policy from 1924 onwards. The ruling blocs continually denied Stalin's opponents the right to organise as an opposition faction within the party—thus, the reinstatement of democratic centralism and free speech within the Communist Party were key arguments of Trotsky's Left Opposition and the later Joint Opposition.

In instituting government policy, Stalin promoted the doctrine of socialism in one country (adopted 1925), wherein the Soviet Union would establish socialism upon Russia's economic foundations (and support socialist revolutions elsewhere). Conversely, Trotsky held that socialism in one country would economically constrain the industrial development of the Soviet Union and thus required assistance from the new socialist countries in the developed world—which was essential for maintaining soviet democracy—in 1924, much undermined by the Russian Civil War of White Army counter-revolution. Trotsky's theory of permanent revolution proposed that socialist revolutions in underdeveloped countries would further dismantle feudal régimes and establish socialist democracies that would not pass through a capitalist stage of development and government. Hence, revolutionary workers should ally politically with peasant political organisations, not capitalist political parties. In contrast, Stalin and his allies proposed that alliances with capitalist political parties were essential to realising a revolution where communists were too few. Said Stalinist practice failed, especially in the Northern Expedition portion of the Chinese Revolution (1926–1928), which resulted in the right-wing Kuomintang's massacre of the Chinese Communist Party. Despite the failure, Stalin's policy of mixed-ideology political alliances nonetheless became Comintern's policy.

Until exiled from Russia in 1929, Trotsky developed and led the Left Opposition (and the later Joint Opposition) with members of the Workers' Opposition, the Decembrists and (later) the Zinovievists. Trotskyism predominated the politics of the Left Opposition, which demanded the restoration of soviet democracy, the expansion of democratic centralism in the Communist Party, national industrialisation, international permanent revolution and socialist internationalism. The Trotskyist demands countered Stalin's political dominance of the Communist Party, which was officially characterised by the "cult of Lenin", the rejection of permanent revolution, and advocated the doctrine of socialism in one country. The Stalinist economic policy vacillated between appeasing the capitalist interests of the kulak in the countryside and destroying them as a social class. Initially, the Stalinists also rejected the national industrialisation of Russia but then pursued it in full, sometimes brutally. In both cases, the Left Opposition denounced the regressive nature of Stalin's policy towards the wealthy kulak social class and the brutality of forced industrialisation. Trotsky described Stalinist vacillation as a symptom of the undemocratic nature of a ruling bureaucracy.

During the 1920s and the 1930s, Stalin fought and defeated the political influence of Trotsky and the Trotskyists in Russia using slander, antisemitism, censorship, expulsions, exile (internal and external), and imprisonment. The anti-Trotsky campaign culminated in the executions (official and unofficial) of the Moscow Trials (1936–1938), which were part of the Great Purge of Old Bolsheviks who had led the Revolution.

 Legacy 
 Debated influence on Stalinism 
Some historians such as Richard Pipes consider Stalinism as the natural consequence of Leninism, that Stalin "faithfully implemented Lenin's domestic and foreign policy programs". Robert Service notes that "institutionally and ideologically Lenin laid the foundations for a Stalin ... but the passage from Leninism to the worse terrors of Stalinism was not smooth and inevitable." Historian and Stalin biographer Edvard Radzinsky believes that Stalin was a genuine follower of Lenin, exactly as he claimed himself. Proponents of continuity cite a variety of contributory factors, in that it was Lenin, rather than Stalin, whose civil war measures introduced the Red Terror with its hostage-taking and internment camps; that it was Lenin who developed the infamous Article 58 and who established the autocratic system within the Russian Communist Party. Proponents also note that Lenin put a ban on factions within the party and introduced the one-party state in 1921, a move that enabled Stalin to get rid of his rivals easily after Lenin's death and cite Felix Dzerzhinsky, who exclaimed during the Bolshevik struggle against opponents in the Russian Civil War: "We stand for organized terror—this should be frankly stated."

Revisionist historians and some post-Cold War and otherwise dissident Soviet historians, including Roy Medvedev, argue that "one could list the various measures carried out by Stalin that were actually a continuation of anti-democratic trends and measures implemented under Lenin", but that "in so many ways, Stalin acted, not in line with Lenin's clear instructions, but in defiance of them." In doing so, some historians have tried to distance Stalinism from Leninism to undermine the totalitarian view that the negative facets of Stalin were inherent in communism from the start. Critics include anti-Stalinist communists such as Leon Trotsky, who pointed out that Lenin attempted to persuade the Russian Communist Party to remove Stalin from his post as its General Secretary. Lenin's Testament, the document which contained this order, was suppressed after Lenin's death. In his biography of Trotsky, British historian Isaac Deutscher says that, on being faced with the evidence, "only the blind and the deaf could be unaware of the contrast between Stalinism and Leninism."

A similar analysis is present in more recent works such as those of Graeme Gill, who argues that "[Stalinism was] not a natural flow-on of earlier developments; [it formed a] sharp break resulting from conscious decisions by leading political actors." However, Gill notes that "difficulties with the use of the term reflect problems with the concept of Stalinism itself. The major difficulty is a lack of agreement about what should constitute Stalinism." Revisionist historians such as Sheila Fitzpatrick have criticized the focus on the upper levels of society and the use of Cold War concepts such as totalitarianism, obscuring the system's reality.

 Left-wing criticism 
As a form of Marxism, revolutionary Leninism was criticised as an undemocratic interpretation of socialism. In The Nationalities Question in the Russian Revolution (1918), Rosa Luxemburg criticised the Bolsheviks for the suppression of the All Russian Constituent Assembly (January 1918); the partitioning of the feudal estates to the peasant communes; and the right of self-determination of every national people of the Russias. That the strategic (geopolitical) mistakes of the Bolsheviks would create significant dangers for the Russian Revolution, such as the bureaucratisation that would arise to administrate the large country that was Bolshevik Russia. In defence of the expedient revolutionary practice, in "Left-Wing" Communism: An Infantile Disorder (1920), Lenin dismissed the political and ideological complaints of the anti-Bolshevik critics, who claimed ideologically correct stances that were to the political left of Lenin. In Marxist philosophy, left communism is a range of left-wing political perspectives among communists. Left communism criticizes the Bolshevik Party's ideology as the revolutionary vanguard. Ideologically, left communists present their perspectives and approaches as authentic Marxism and thus more oriented to the proletariat than the Leninism of the Communist International at their first (1919) and second (1920) congresses. Proponents of left communism include Amadeo Bordiga, Herman Gorter, Paul Mattick, Sylvia Pankhurst, Antonie Pannekoek and Otto Rühle.

Historically, the Dutch-German communist left has been most critical of Lenin and Leninism,. yet the Italian communist left remained Leninist. Bordiga said: "All this work of demolishing opportunism and 'deviationism' (Lenin: What Is To Be Done?) is today the basis of party activity. The party follows revolutionary tradition and experiences in this work during these periods of revolutionary reflux and the proliferation of opportunist theories, which had as their violent and inflexible opponents Marx, Engels, Lenin, and the Italian Left." In The Lenin Legend (1935), Paul Mattick said that the council communist tradition, begun by the Dutch-German leftists, also is critical of Leninism. Contemporary left-communist organisations, such as the Internationalist Communist Tendency and the International Communist Current, view Lenin as an essential and influential theorist but remain critical of Leninism as political praxis for the proletarian revolution.

Nonetheless, the Bordigism of the International Communist Party abides Bordiga's strict Leninism. Ideologically aligned with the Dutch-German left, among the ideologists of contemporary communisation, the theorist Gilles Dauvé criticised Leninism as a "by-product of Kautskyism". In The Soviet Union Versus Socialism (1986), Noam Chomsky said that Stalinism was the logical development of Leninism and not an ideological deviation from Lenin's policies, which resulted in collectivisation enforced with a police state. In light of the tenets of socialism, Leninism was a right-wing deviation from Marxism.

The vanguard-party revolution of Leninism became the ideological basis of the communist parties in the socialist political spectrum. In the People's Republic of China, the Chinese Communist Party organised itself with Maoism (the Thought of Mao Zedong), socialism with Chinese characteristics. In Singapore, the People's Action Party (PAP) featured internal democracy and initiated single-party dominance in the government and politics of Singapore. In the event, the practical application of Maoism to the socio-economic conditions of Third World countries produced revolutionary vanguard parties, such as the Communist Party of Peru – Red Fatherland.

 See also 
 "He who does not work neither shall he eat"
 National delimitation in the Soviet Union
 Yellow socialism

 References 

 Further reading Selected works by Vladimir Lenin The Development of Capitalism in Russia, 1899.
 What Is To Be Done? Burning Questions of Our Movement, 1902.
 The Three Sources and Three Component Parts of Marxism, 1913.
 The Right of Nations to Self-Determination, 1914.
 Imperialism, the Highest Stage of Capitalism, 1917.
 The State and Revolution, 1917.
 The Tasks of the Proletariat in the Present Revolution (The "April Theses"), 1917.
 "Left-Wing" Childishness and the Petty Bourgois Mentality, 1918.
 Left-Wing Communism: an Infantile Disorder, 1920.
 "Last Testament" Letters to the Congress, 1923–1924.Histories Isaac Deutscher. The Prophet Armed: Trotsky 1879–1921, 1954.
 Isaac Deutscher. The Prophet Unarmed: Trotsky 1921–1929, 1959.
 Moshe Lewin. Lenin's Last Struggle, 1969.
 Edward Hallett Carr. The Russian Revolution From Lenin to Stalin: 1917–1929, 1979.Other authors 
 
 
 
 
 
 
 
 
 
 
 
 
 
 
 
 

 External links Works by Vladimir Lenin What Is To Be Done?.
 Imperialism: The Highest Stage of Capitalism.
 The State and Revolution.
 "The Lenin Archive".
 "First Conference of the Communist International".Other thematic links'
 "Marcel Liebman on Lenin and democracy".
 "An excerpt on Leninism and State Capitalism from the work of Noam Chomsky".
 Rosa Luxemburg. "Organizational Questions of the Russian Social Democracy".
 Karl Korsch. "Lenin's Philosophy".
 "Cyber Leninism".
 "Leninist Ebooks".
 Anton Pannekoek. "Lenin as a Philosopher".
 Paul Mattick. "The Lenin Legend".

 
Authoritarianism
Eponymous political ideologies
Far-left politics
Linear theories
Marxist schools of thought
Types of socialism
Vladimir Lenin